

Results

Final standings

England win the tournament with two victories.

European Nations Cup
European rugby league championship
International rugby league competitions hosted by the United Kingdom
International rugby league competitions hosted by France